Cliffe (TQ 738 748  ) was a railway station between Uralite Halt and High Halstow Halt on the Hundred of Hoo Railway in Kent, England. It was opened on 1 April 1882 and closed to passengers on 4 December 1961 and freight on 20 August 1962. It originally only had one platform, a second platform was built in 1935. The station was demolished soon after closure although one track through the station site remains and still carries freight traffic.

References

External links
 Cliffe station on navigable 1940 O. S. map

Disused railway stations in Kent
Former South Eastern Railway (UK) stations
Railway stations in Great Britain opened in 1882
Railway stations in Great Britain closed in 1961
1882 establishments in England
1961 disestablishments in England
Transport in Medway